Gilpin is an unincorporated community in  Casey County, Kentucky, United States.

A post office was established in the community then known as Shackelford in 1881. In 1887, postmaster William Gilpin renamed it after his own family.

References

Unincorporated communities in Casey County, Kentucky
Unincorporated communities in Kentucky